Giovanni Pietro de Bono, O.P. (died 1546) was a Roman Catholic prelate who served as Bishop of Minori (1526–1546).

Biography
Giovanni Pietro de Bono was ordained a priest in the Order of Preachers.
On 28 Feb 1526, he was appointed during the papacy of Pope Clement VII as Bishop of Minori.
He served as Bishop of Minori until his death on 6 Jun 1546.

See also 
Catholic Church in Italy

References

External links and additional sources
 (for Chronology of Bishops) 
 (for Chronology of Bishops) 

16th-century Italian Roman Catholic bishops
Bishops appointed by Pope Clement VII
1546 deaths
Dominican bishops